Mr. Zivago (real name: Massimo Rastrelli) is an Italian singer, best known for the song .

Discography 
 Albums
 Tell by Your Eyes (1992)
  (1993)

 Singles
 "Little Russian" (1987)
 "Love in Moscow" (1991)
 "Tell By Your Eyes" (1992) – number 98 in Japan
 Covered and released in Japan as a single in 1992 by Toshihiko Tahara, see "雨が叫んでる" in the Japanese Wikipedia.
 "Russian Paradise" (2007)

References

External links 
 Mr. Zivago official Russian website 
 Mr. Zivago at Discopedia 

Living people
1961 births